Matthew Brady (1799–1826) was an Australian bushranger.

Matthew Brady may also refer to:

 Matthew Brady (footballer) (born 1977), former English footballer
 Matthew Brady (lawyer), San Francisco district attorney
 Matthew Francis Brady (1893–1959), American prelate of the Roman Catholic Church
 Matthew Harrison Brady, the antagonist of Jerome Lawrence and Robert Lee's play Inherit the Wind

See also
 Mathew Brady (1822–1896), American photographer who documented the American Civil War
 Matt Brady (born 1965), head men's basketball coach at James Madison University